Traffic Jam is a 1979 Italian satirical comedy-drama film directed by Luigi Comencini. It was entered into the 1979 Cannes Film Festival. The film, although uncredited, is based on the 1966 short story "L'Autoroute du sud" by Julio Cortázar.

Plot
In a main thoroughfare on the outskirts of Rome, thousands of motorists are stuck in terrible traffic jam for twenty-four hours. In a stretch of road there is a variety of characters whose behaviour becomes strange. There is a selfish and hypocritical entrepreneur in a luxury car; a young hippie girl harassed and then raped by some dandies and a family from Naples on the way to Rome to abort their daughter.

The day the traffic jam clears, the entrepreneur hires the girl from Naples for a record company in exchange for a sexual service. The girl is raped and then comforted by a man who wants to avenge her but then gives up. The rapists leave quietly once more.

Cast
 Annie Girardot as Irene
 Fernando Rey as Carlo
 Miou-Miou as Angela
 Gérard Depardieu as Franco
 Ugo Tognazzi as Professor
 Marcello Mastroianni as Marco Montefoschi
 Stefania Sandrelli as Teresa
 Alberto Sordi as De Benedetti
 Orazio Orlando as Ferreri
 Gianni Cavina as Pompeo
 Harry Baer as Mario
 Ángela Molina as Martina
 Ciccio Ingrassia as The Dying Man
 Patrick Dewaere as Young man
 José Sacristán as The Priest

References

External links

1979 films
1979 comedy-drama films
1979 comedy films
1979 drama films
Italian comedy-drama films
1970s Italian-language films
Films set in Rome
Films directed by Luigi Comencini
Films with screenplays by Ruggero Maccari
Films produced by Michael Fengler
Films based on works by Julio Cortázar
Films scored by Fiorenzo Carpi
1970s Italian films